Robert Cope may refer to:
 Robert Cope (died 1753), Irish Member of Parliament
 Robert Camden Cope (died 1818), Member of Parliament for Armagh
 Robert Cope (basketball) (Robert Kridler Cope, 1911–1995), American basketball player
 Bob Cope (basketball) (Robert D. Cope, 1928–2011), American basketball player and coach
 Jack Cope (Robert Knox Cope), South African writer

See also
 Bob Cope,  American football coach